James Edward "Lefty" York (November 1, 1892 – April 9, 1961) was an American professional baseball pitcher. He played two seasons in Major League Baseball (MLB) for the Philadelphia Athletics and Chicago Cubs. In 42 career games pitched, he posted a 5-11 career record, allowing 183 hits, 5 home runs and 95 runs. 
 
In 1919 as a member of the A's, York pitched just two games, recording losses in both of them. In 1921 as a member of the Cubs, he pitched in 40 games including 11 starts and posted 5-9 record.

Lefty York was born on November 1, 1892 in West Fork, Arkansas, and died on April 9, 1961 in York, Pennsylvania.

External links

Major League Baseball pitchers
Philadelphia Athletics players
Chicago Cubs players
Baseball players from Arkansas
1892 births
1961 deaths
People from West Fork, Arkansas